Clarkwood is an area on the west side of Corpus Christi, Texas. Clarkwood was a town before being annexed by Corpus Christi in 1962.

Education
Tuloso-Midway Independent School District
Tuloso-Midway High School

External links
The Handbook of Texas Online

Geography of Corpus Christi, Texas